The second season of the television sitcom Brooklyn Nine-Nine premiered September 28, 2014, on Fox and ended May 17, 2015, with 23 episodes.

Summary
Jake returns to the precinct after going undercover to help take down the mafia, but is discouraged when one mobster manages to escape. He then begins a relationship with defense lawyer Sophia Perez, which ends based on their professions. Amy also breaks up with Teddy. Holt continues a battle of wits with Deputy Commissioner Madeline Wuntch that culminates in Wuntch making Holt the head of the NYPD Public Affairs Division, leaving the Nine-Nine. Charles and Gina's affair is exposed, after which Charles' dad and Gina's mom get married. Rosa begins a relationship with Holt's nephew Marcus. Amy and Jake kiss while they are on an undercover job and a relationship develops.

Cast

Main
 Andy Samberg as Jake Peralta
 Stephanie Beatriz as Rosa Diaz
 Terry Crews as Terry Jeffords
 Melissa Fumero as Amy Santiago
 Joe Lo Truglio as Charles Boyle
 Chelsea Peretti as Gina Linetti
 Andre Braugher as Raymond Holt

Starring
 Dirk Blocker as Michael Hitchcock
 Joel McKinnon Miller as Norm Scully

Recurring
 Kyra Sedgwick as Deputy Commissioner Madelyn Wuntch
 Nick Cannon as Marcus
 Eva Longoria as Sophia Perez
 Stephen Root as Lynn Boyle
 Sandra Bernhard as Darlene Linetti

Guest
 Jenny Slate as Bianca
 Dan Bakkedahl as Lieutenant Andrew Miller
 Ed Helms as Jack Danger
 Craig Robinson as Doug Judy
 Nick Kroll as Agent Kendrick
 Garret Dillahunt as Detective Dave Majors
 Bradley Whitford as Captain Roger Peralta
 Chris Parnell as Geoffrey Hoytsman
 Makayla Lysiak as Tricia

Episodes

Reception

Critical response
The second season received critical acclaim. The review aggregator website Rotten Tomatoes reports a 100% approval rating, with an average score of 7.96/10, based on 17 reviews. The website's consensus reads, "Brooklyn Nine-Nines winning cast, appealing characters and wacky gags make it good comfort food."

Awards and nominations

References

External links
  at Fox
 

 
2014 American television seasons
2015 American television seasons
Brooklyn Nine-Nine